Ciechanów Voivodeship was a unit of administrative division and local government in Poland in years 1975–1998, superseded by the Masovian Voivodeship. Its capital city was Ciechanów.

Major cities and towns (population in 1995)
 Ciechanów (46,600)
 Mława (29,800)
 Płońsk (22,700)
 Działdowo (20,700)

See also
 Voivodeships of Poland

Former voivodeships of Poland (1975–1998)
History of Masovian Voivodeship